Neil George Ferris (October 31, 1927 – January 30, 1996) was an American football defensive back and halfback in the National Football League.

A graduate of Loyola Marymount University, Ferris was inducted into their Hall of Fame in 1991.  Ferris played for three NFL teams, the Washington Redskins in 1951–1952, the Philadelphia Eagles in 1952, and also the Los Angeles Rams, in 1953.

External links

1927 births
1996 deaths
People from Bell, California
Loyola Marymount University alumni
Washington Redskins players
Philadelphia Eagles players
Los Angeles Rams players
Players of American football from California
Sportspeople from Los Angeles County, California